Vasyl Anatoliyovych Lomachenko (also spelled Vasiliy; born 17 February 1988) is a Ukrainian professional boxer. He has held multiple world championships in three weight classes from featherweight to lightweight, including unified and lineal titles at lightweight.

Lomachenko is one of the most successful amateur boxers of all time, possessing a record of 396 wins and 1 loss, with that loss avenged twice. Competing in the featherweight and lightweight divisions, he won a silver medal at the 2007 World Championships, gold at the 2008 European Championships, consecutive gold at the 2008 and 2012 Olympics, and consecutive gold at the 2009 and 2011 World Championships.

Making his professional debut in 2013, Lomachenko tied the record with Saensak Muangsurin for winning a world title in the fewest professional fights, becoming the WBO featherweight champion in his third fight. He is known for his exceptional hand speed, timing, accuracy, creativity, athleticism, defence and footwork.

He has won several awards by media outlets throughout his career. The Ring magazine and ESPN named him Prospect of the Year in 2013; CBS Sports named him Boxer of the Year in 2016; HBO Sports named him Boxer of the Year in 2016 and in 2017; and the Boxing Writers Association of America and The Ring named him Fighter of the Year in 2017.

As of January 2023, Lomachenko is ranked as the world's seventh best active boxer, pound for pound, by The Ring. He is also ranked as the world's second best active lightweight by The Ring and ESPN, third by the Transnational Boxing Rankings Board, and fourth by BoxRec.

Early life
Lomachenko was coached by his father Anatoly Lomachenko from a young age. He claims that if his father had not been a boxing coach he probably would have chosen to play ice hockey professionally. According to Bob Arum in 2017, Lomachenko's father did not let him train for boxing until he attended traditional Ukrainian dance classes. He then went on to gymnastics before finally getting into the ring.

Amateur career
At the 2007 World Championships in Chicago, he won silver by beating Abner Cotto in the first round, Theodoros Papazov, Mikhail Bernadski, Arturo Santos Reyes, and Li Yang in the semifinal to reach fellow southpaw and Russian favorite Albert Selimov, to whom he lost 11–16.

Lomachenko won gold at the 2008 Olympic Games in Beijing. He beat his five opponents by an astonishing 45 point margin, outscoring them 58–13, en route to his first gold medal at the senior level. He was subsequently named the outstanding boxer of the tournament and awarded the Val Barker Trophy. Additionally, he won gold again that year to also become continental champion at the European Championships in Liverpool.

He won gold at the 2009 World Championships in Milan. He then competed as a lightweight at the 2011 World Championships in Baku after AIBA removed the featherweight division. There, he won his second consecutive gold medal to become a two-weight world champion.

Following a forced move up to lightweight, he won his second consecutive Olympic gold medal at the 2012 Olympic Games in London to become a rare two-weight Olympic champion. He defeated Han Soon-Chul of South Korea in the final, and was a strong candidate to win the Val Barker Trophy for a second time in what would have historically been an unprecedented feat. Ultimately, he was edged by welterweight gold medal winner, Serik Sapiyev, of Kazakhstan.

He finished his extensive amateur career with an impressive record of 396 wins and only one loss, to Albert Selimov, which was avenged twice. In November 2017, boxing website The Sweet Science conducted a readers' poll, which ran for several weeks, to determine the amateur boxer regarded by the public majority as the all-time best. Alongside Lomachenko, the five other standout finalists selected were: Laszlo Papp, Teofilo Stevenson, Felix Savon, Mark Breland, and Guillermo Rigondeaux. While none were able to claim the majority vote, Lomachenko won a plurality, having led the poll with nearly one-third of the total votes cast.

World Championships results 
2007
Defeated Abner Cotto (Puerto Rico) 26–9
Defeated Theodoros Papazov (Greece) 19–5
Defeated Mikhail Bernadski (Belarus) 21–6
Defeated Arturo Santos Reyes (Mexico) RSCO 3 
Defeated Li Yang (China) 14–13
Lost to Albert Selimov (Russia) 11–16

2009
Defeated Mario Aleksić (Bosnia and Herzegovina) 16–2
Defeated Craig Evans (Wales) 15–1
Defeated Branimir Stanković (Serbia) 8–2
Defeated Oscar Valdez (Mexico) 12–1
Defeated Sergey Vodopyanov (Russia) 12–1

2011
Defeated Lomalito Moala (Tonga) RSC 1 
Defeated José Carlos Ramírez (USA) 16–9 
Defeated Robson Conceicao (Brasil) 19–18 
Defeated Fazliddin Gaibnazarov (Uzbekistan) 18–10
Defeated Domenico Valentino (Italy) 17–11
Defeated Yasniel Toledo (Cuba) 17–12

Junior World Championships results 
2006
Defeated Derenik Gizhlaryan (Armenia) 34–14
Defeated Sergey Vodopyanov (Russia) 37–17
Defeated Andrew Selby (Wales) RSCO
Defeated Rahim Najafov (Azerbaijan) RSCO
Defeated Albert Portuondo (Cuba) RSCO 3

Olympic Games results 
2008
Defeated Albert Selimov (Russia) 14–7
Defeated Bahodirjon Sooltonov (Uzbekistan) 13–1
Defeated Li Yang (China) 12–3
Defeated Yakup Kılıç (Turkey) 10–1
Defeated Khedafi Djelkhir (France) 9–1 RSC 1 

2012
1st round bye 
Defeated Wellington Arias (Dominican Republic) 15–3
Defeated Félix Verdejo (Puerto Rico) 14–9
Defeated Yasniel Toledo (Cuba) 14–11
Defeated Han Soon-Chul (Republic of Korea) 19–9

European Championships results 
2008
Defeated Vladimir Nikiforov (Estonia) 10–0
Defeated David Oliver Joyce (Ireland) 10–2
Defeated Hicham Ziouti (France) 2–1
Defeated Araik Ambartsumov (Russia) 7–1

Cadet European Championships results 
2004
Defeated Constantin Paraschiv (Romania) 23–8
Defeated Edgaras Žemaitis (Lithuania) RSCO
Defeated Samvel Barseghyan (Armenia) RSCO 2
Defeated Farid Aleshkin (Russia) 34–12

World Series of Boxing 
Prior to turning professional, Lomachenko competed in the lightweight division of the World Series of Boxing (WSB) from January to May 2013. Some outlets would later claim that the six fights Lomachenko had in this tournament should have counted towards his professional record, due to WSB being professional boxing by law, with no headgear and rounds being scored using the ten-point must system according to the regulations set by professional boxing commissions that license the boxers, promoters, and officials.

Professional career

Featherweight 
After winning his second Olympic gold medal, Lomachenko made the decision to turn professional. After meeting with several fight promoters, he signed a contract to fight for Top Rank. Lomachenko made his professional debut in United States on 12 October 2013 as part of the undercard to Timothy Bradley vs. Juan Manuel Márquez, defeating Mexican fighter José Ramirez with a fourth-round knockout.

Lomachenko vs. Salido 

Lomachenko attempted to make history by winning a world championship in his second fight and breaking Saensak Muangsurin's record, who won a junior welterweight world title in his third pro fight in 1975. He challenged veteran boxer Orlando Salido for World Boxing Organization's featherweight title. The title became vacant after Salido failed to make weight, weighed in 128¼ pounds, over the 126 pound limit. On fight night, he rehydrated to 147 pounds, which was equivalent to the welterweight limit. All of which were still legal since there were no rehydration clauses disclosed in the contract. The fight took place in front of 7,323 at the Alamodome in San Antonio, Texas on 1 March 2014. Lomachenko would earn $631,000, for what was his second professional bout.

Lomachenko seemed to shy away from engaging Salido throughout most of the fight, probably due to Salido landing numerous low blows and head-butts that the referee failed to call and/or deduct a point. A total of 52 low blows can easily be counted throughout the bout, something that his opponent exploited. A late surge, which saw him injure Salido in the final round, was unable to change the final result, losing by split decision. Two judges had it for Salido 116–112 and 115–113, while the third had it for Lomachenko 115–113. Lomachenko, for his part, stated he felt the decision was fair and accepted blame for not following through with his corner's game plan, promising to learn from the experience and come back stronger. The referee of the fight, Laurence Cole, was roundly criticized by many boxing media outlets for his seemingly ignoring the very many foul blows by Salido, and his perceived failure to properly conduct the match.

Lomachenko vs. Russell Jr. 
The WBO title remained vacant due to Salido not making weight. On 20 March 2014 the WBO contacted Golden Boy Promotions and Top Rank to make them aware that they had 30 days to negotiate a fight between Lomachenko and Gary Russell Jr. (24-0, 14 KO) for the vacant WBO featherweight title. In an interview, WBO President Paco Valcarcel said that the fight should take place no later than July 2014. Purse bids were scheduled which Golden Boy won with a bid of $1,052,500, while Top Rank bid $1,050,000. Lomachenko was entitled to $631,350 (60%) and Russell Jr. was entitled to $420,900 (40%). Golden Boy CEO Richard Schaefer challenged Lomachenko's residency. According to the WBO, "If the fight is held in the country of origin, residence or nationality of one of the contenders, the resident contestant shall receive 40 percent and his opponent shall receive 60 percent off the total purse offered." Schaefer claimed Lomachenko resided in Marina del Rey, California. It was later ascertained that Lomachenko had rented a home in California to live in while training, while Ukraine remained his permanent residence.

The fight took place on 21 June at the StubHub Center in Carson, California. Lomachenko defeated Russell Jr. via twelve-round majority decision to win the vacant WBO featherweight title. Judge Lisa Giampa scored the fight a 114–114 draw, but judges Max DeLuca and Pat Russell scored the fight 116–112 in favour of Lomachenko. Lomachenko used his power and swift skills to maintain control of the fight until the final bell. Lomachenko began to hurt Russell Jr. more in the later rounds with power shots. Russell Jr. landed only 10% of his punches thrown, with a lot of combinations being missed or blocked. Lomachenko landed 183 of 597 punches thrown (31%) and Russell Jr. landed 83 of his 806 thrown. With this victory, Lomachenko joined Saensak Muangsurin as the only other boxer to have won a world title in the quickest amount of time since turning professional, accomplishing the feat in just his third professional bout. The fight averaged 578,000 viewers.

Lomachenko vs. Piriyapinyo 
Lomachenko made his first title defense against mandatory challenger Chonlatarn Piriyapinyo of Thailand. This fight took place on the undercard of the Pacquiao vs. Algieri on HBO PPV bout on November 22, 2014 at the Cotai Arena, Venetian Resort in Macao. Although Piritapinyo's record of 52 wins and 1 loss made the fight sound challenging for Lomachenko, the only time he stepped up in his 11-year career was in 2012 against Chris John, which he lost via unanimous decision. Lomachenko handled his opponent easily, hurting him a few times and scoring a knockdown at the end of the fourth round. In the seventh round, Lomachenko stopped using his left hand; it was later confirmed that he injured that hand. Lomachenko won a unanimous decision with the scores of 120–107 on all three of the judges' scorecards. Lomachenko landed 368 of 1006 punches thrown (37%) and Piriyapinyo landed 94 of his 501 thrown (19%).

Lomachenko vs. Rodríguez 
It was announced prior to Lomachenko's mandatory fight against Piriyapinyo that the winner would next fight 28 year old Puerto Rican boxer Gamalier Rodríguez. Rodriguez earned the title shot after knocking out Martin Cardona. The fight was announced to take place on 2 May 2015 on the under-card of Mayweather-Pacquiao at the MGM Grand Garden Arena. Prior to the fight, Rodriguez was on a 17-fight winning streak dating back to 2010, where the fight resulted in a first round technical draw. Top Rank announced before the fight that Lomachenko had signed a five-year contract extension. On fight night, Lomachenko retained his WBO title against Rodriguez via a ninth-round KO victory. Lomachenko's speed and precision was too much for Rodriguez, who took a knee twice in the fight, once in the seventh and again in the ninth, which ended the bout. He was also docked a point by referee in fifth round for a low blow. Lomachenko landed 227 of 586 punches thrown (39%) compared to Rodriguez who landed only 55 of 285 (19%). After the fight, Lomachenko spoke through a translator about his performance, "I was just boxing for the fans, having a good time out there." Top Rank were hoping to match Lomachenko with then-WBA featherweight champion Nicholas Walters in a unification fight. Lomachenko had a $750,000 purse for the defence.

Lomachenko vs. Koasicha 
Lomachenko next fought on the Tim Bradley vs. Brandon Rios undercard on HBO against #7 WBO ranked 24 year old Romulo Koasicha. The fight took place on 7 November 2015 at the Mandalay Bay Resort & Casino in Paradise, Nevada. He overwhelmed, dominated and stopped Koasicha in the tenth round on a body shot. In the post fight interview, Lomachenko told of how he wanted to put on a good show, "I was just having fun in there, "If I really wanted to knock him out, I would have done it earlier. I was having a good time, but I knew the end would be on a body shot. I just didn't know which one." Lomachenko earned a career high $750,000 for the fight and out landed Koasicha by 259 punches. Compubox stats showed that Lomachenko dominated throughout, landing 334 of his 717 punches thrown (47%). Koasicha only managed to land 75 of 607 (12%) and earned $35,000 for the loss. The loss ended Koasicha's run of 4 straight wins and he suffered his first stoppage defeat.

Junior lightweight

Lomachenko vs. Martinez 
Following a third successful defense, Lomachenko, still the reigning WBO featherweight champion decided to move up weight to junior lightweight to challenge Román Martínez for his WBO title on 11 June 2016 at the Madison Square Garden Theater. Martinez was coming off a draw against Orlando Salido in September 2015, after he controversially defeated him in their first fight in April 2015 for the WBO title. Lomachenko became the fastest boxer to win a world title in two weight divisions knocking out Martinez in the 5th round of the world title fight. Lomachenko dominated the fight from the start with superior footwork, hand speed and slick punching from different angles. According to CompuBox, Lomachenko out-landed Martinez 87 to 34. After the fight, Lomachenko called out Orlando Salido, "Hey Salido, I'm ready to fight you at any time, before the Vargas fight, I told him to win the fight but I never told him I wasn't going to fight him if he didn't, so let's do it. I want to revenge Salido for my fans and give them a win over him." Lomachenko was paid $850,000 for the bout, at the time a career-high purse.

Lomachenko vs. Walters 
After failing to make the fight happen earlier in the year, Top Rank vice president Carl Moretti confirmed on September 28 that Lomachenko would defend his WBO title against 30 year old unbeaten Jamaican boxer Nicholas Walters at The Cosmopolitan in Las Vegas on 26 November on HBO. In previous negotiations, Walters turned down a career-high $550,000 purse, even after Lomachenko offered him a further $300,000 from his own purse if Walters won. HBO provided the remainder of Walter's purse for the fight to go ahead. The event marked Bob Arum's 2,000th promoted card, as well as celebrating his 50th anniversary as a promoter.

After Lomachenko dominated the first six rounds with his movement, he threw more combination punches in the seventh which left Walters visibly shaken. Lomachenko won the fight after Walters retired on his stool at the end of the seventh round. Upon returning to his corner, Walters got up and walked to referee Tony Weeks, where he reiterated twice he did not want to continue. A lot of boos followed the confirmation of the fight result as Walters seemed to back himself up for not returning for round 8, blaming his inactivity in the ring, "Listen to me, if I get the chance to fight two or three fights leading up to this fight, I'll definitely take him on in different circumstances where we are more active and definitely beat him but it was all him tonight... he fought me with three fights this year. So it was all him tonight... Nothing take away from him, he's a very good fighter, I learned a lot from fighting him and it was seven rounds of beautiful boxing until my corner decided to end it."

CompuBox stats showed Lomachenko landed 114 of 437 punches thrown (26 percent) while Walters landed 49 of 264 (19 percent). Lomachenko earned his first $1 million purse. Following the post fight, Arum told ESPN, he would like to make a rematch with Salido next, followed by a lightweight title fight against Terry Flanagan and then a super fight with Manny Pacquiao. The fight drew 761,000 viewers on HBO.

Lomachenko vs. Sosa 
On 2 February 2017, Bob Arum spoke to ESPN. After failing to make a match up with WBA (Super) champion Jezreel Corrales, he announced Lomachenko's next fight would take place on 8 April at the MGM National Harbor in Washington, D.C., in a super featherweight unification against WBA (Regular) champion Jason Sosa. This would have been Sosa's third defence of his secondary title, but on 16 February, he vacated the title. Lomachenko weighed 129.6 pounds. Sosa weighed in at 130.4 pounds, he then stripped down naked and still over weighed at 130.2 and was given the time to trim the extra weight. He later returned to the Maryland commission's scale and successfully made weight exactly 130 pounds allowing himself to challenge for the WBO title. The fight headlined HBO World Championship Boxing. In front of a sell-out crowd of 2,828, mostly Ukrainian, Lomachenko successfully retained his WBO title for a second time after Sosa failed to return for round 10 when his trainer pulled him out. The bout was similar to Lomachenko's previous fight with Walters, who also pulled out. Lomachenko's flashy style and fast combinations won him the rounds. Sosa appeared more hurt in round 8 when he was hit hard on the body.

Sosa was the most successful opponent Lomachenko had fought since Salido in terms of landing punches. He landed 68 of his 286 thrown (24%). Lomachenko landed 275 of 696 punches (40%). Sosa's trainer, Raul Rivas explained why he pulled him out of the fight, "It was an accumulation of too many punches. I didn't want to get Jason hurt. He was out of the fight." Lomachenko said he wanted to follow this victory by only fighting current world champions at super featherweight for a chance to unify the division or he would move up lightweight. Lomachenko's purse for the fight was $800,000. The fight peaked at 886,000 viewers HBO and averaged 832,000 viewers. These numbers showed an increase in viewership for Lomachenko from his last fight on HBO against Walters.

Lomachenko vs. Marriaga 
On 30 June 2017 Top Rank announced that a deal was in place for Lomachenko to make a third defense of his WBO title against Colombian former featherweight world title challenger Miguel Marriaga, who was coming off a loss and moving up to super featherweight. It was confirmed that the fight would take place live on ESPN on August 5, 2017 at the Microsoft Theater in Los Angeles. Carl Moretti of Top Rank stated that Salido had initially turned down a $720,000 purse to fight Lomachenko in a rematch. Even after negotiations to meet his financial needs, Salido still denied the offer due to other problems, mentioning weight and hand issues.

In front of 4,102 people, Lomachenko dominated the fight from the opening bell and proved too much for Marriaga, dropping him twice in the fight, before Marriaga's corner stopped the fight after round 7. Lomachenko retained his WBO title for the third time. The first knockdown came towards the end of the third round when Lomachenko landed a straight left to Marriaga, who was off balance. Marriaga got up straight away and didn't appear hurt. In the fourth round, an accidental clash of heads opened up a cut above Lomachenko's left eye. In the following round, Lomachenko protested to referee Jack Reiss, claiming he was being hit low and headbutted. In the seventh round, Lomachenko landed body shots and uppercuts, eventually dropping Marriaga for the second time with a left hook at 2 minutes and 59 seconds of round 7. Marriaga beat the count and walked towards his corner. The referee waved an end to the fight moments later. Although it was a corner retirement, the California State Athletic Commission ruled it a KO win. Lomachenko earned a $750,000 purse for the fight, compared to the $50,000 received by Marriaga.

During the post fight interviews, Marriaga praised Lomachenko, "He dominated the fight. I connected with some good punches, but I couldn't get the result I was looking for. I wanted to continue the fight, but my corner stopped the fight. He basically overwhelmed me with pressure." Bob Arum also showed his admiration of Lomachenko, comparing him to former heavyweight world champion and legend Muhammad Ali, who had 27 of his professional fight promoted by Arum. He said "I never saw anything like this. He's unbelievable. Not only does he have the knowledge, he has the skill set that I've never seen before. Fast, reflexes, everything and he really entertains. Who else did that? Muhammad Ali." The fight averaged 728,000 viewers on ESPN. The move from HBO to ESPN was done to expose Lomachenko and gain more viewership, but was down by 104,000 compared to Lomachenko's last fight against Sosa on HBO. Viewership was adversely affected by a channel switch when the broadcast began and the time at which their main event started.

Lomachenko vs. Rigondeaux 

On 6 August, Arum stated that Lomachenko would fight for a third time in 2017, likely on 9 or 23 December. When asked who the potential options were, Arum stated, "Well, there's a few guys. (Guillermo) Rigondeaux if he answers Dino (Duva's) call. There's (Orlando) Salido, who's sniffing around and the third is (Miguel) Berchelt." Arum also mentioned lightweight contender Ray Beltrán, but said he would like to capture a world title at lightweight before a potential fight with Lomachenko. Salido informed his manager Sean Gibbons, that he had no issues with fighting Lomachenko in December. Gibbons believed Lomachenko needed Salido more than Salido would need Lomanchenko, as Lomachenko was looking to raise TV ratings and sell out a 10,000 capacity arena. On 14 August, Arum spoke to LA Times and confirmed either Rigondeaux or Salido would be Lomachenko's next opponent. He stated if the bout with Rigondeaux was made, it would likely take place at the Madison Square Garden Theatre and a potential rematch with Salido would take place in Los Angeles.

On 21 August Arum stated the Lomachenko and Rigondeaux camps were closing in on finalizing a deal for December 9. A fight with the two-weight world champion and reigning super bantamweight title holder, a two-time Olympic Gold Medalist and one of the most successful amateur boxers ever, would take place at 130 pounds. The fight was officially confirmed on 15 September. It was since confirmed that the fight would in fact be at the Theater, headlining an ESPN televised card. On 18 November, Carl Moretti of Top Rank revealed a re-hydration clause on the contract. Both fighters agreed to weigh in at 09:00 on the morning of the fight, where they would not be able to exceed 138 pounds. Any fighter over the limit would face a penalty of more than $10,000. On fight night, Lomachenko weighed 137.4 pounds and Rigondeaux weighed 130 pounds.

In front of a sell-out crowd of 5,102 at the Theater, Lomachenko retained his WBO title, dominating the fight with superior boxing skills, forcing Rigondeaux to retire on his stool after round 6. Rigondeaux stated he had broken the top of his left hand in round two, which was the reason he did not come out for round 7. Rigondeax became Lomachenko's fourth consecutive opponent to retire on his stool. The loss also marked the first time Rigondeaux had lost since 2003, when he was still an amateur. At the time of stoppage, Lomachenko was ahead on all three judges' scorecards, 60–53, 59–54, and 59–54.

In the post-fight interviews, Lomachenko was asked about Rigondeaux being his fourth consecutive opponent to retire on his stool, to which Lomachenko joked, "Maybe I should change my second name, now my name is 'No Mas Chenko'." He also went on to say, "This is not his weight, so it's not a big win for me. But he's a good fighter. He's got great skills. I adjusted to his style, low blows and all." Speaking to an interpreter, Rigondeaux said, "I lost, no excuses. I injured the top of my left hand in the second round. He's a very technical fighter. He's explosive. I'm gonna come back because that's what I do. The weight was not a factor in this fight. It was the injury to my hand." According to CompuBox statistics, Lomachenko landed 55 of 339 punches thrown (16%) and Rigondeax landed 15 of his 178 thrown (8%), landing no more than 3 punches per round. For the fight, Lomachenko was guaranteed a purse of $1.2 million whereas Rigondeaux earned a $400,000 purse. On December 12, Dino Duva of Roc Nation Sport, confirmed that Rigondeaux had bruised his hand and not fractured it, as initially stated. The card averaged 1.73 million viewers on ESPN, which did not include ESPN Deportes or the online streaming service.

Lightweight 
The Los Angeles Times Lance Pugmire was told by Bob Arum on 26 January 2018 that Lomachenko would have his next fight at lightweight. Arum stated he was unable to make unification fights at super featherweight against WBC champion Miguel Berchelt and WBA titleholder Alberto Machado which was the main reason for the move up.

Lomachenko vs. Linares 
On 30 January, Arum told ESPN that negotiations had begun in December 2017 for a fight between Lomachenko and WBA, The Ring Magazine lightweight champion Jorge Linares after speaking to Teiken Promotions, Linares' lead promoter, with the fight to take place on either 28 April or 12 May 2018. The fight would main event an ESPN card. Arum was pushing for the fight to take place at Madison Square Garden on 12 May 2018. The reason behind the date was explained by Arum, "May 12th is an extraordinarily important date for ESPN programming. It's right in the middle of the basketball playoffs." Carl Moretti called Eric Gomez of Golden Boy informing them of the date. Gomez stated they were happy with the fight, however the date of 12 May was not a good date for them, as they already had plans for that date. HBO would likely air the pay-per-view replay of Gennady Golovkin vs. Canelo Álvarez rematch, along with a live bout. On 17 February, Gomez stated the fight was not called off and Arum would need to be more flexible with the date as Golden Boy accepted Arum's terms that the fight would take place in New York. On 13 March, Los Angeles Times confirmed that terms had been agreed between both sides. The agreement was reached after ESPN agreed to televise the fight at 8 p.m. ET/5 p.m. PT, so it would broadcast before HBO's telecast on the same day. Madison Square Garden in New York City was confirmed as the venue. On 21 March, the fight was officially announced. WBO president Francisco Valcarcel told Lomachenko, regardless of result, he would have 10 days to decide on whether he would return to super featherweight and defend his WBO or vacate. Both boxers weighed in 134.6 pounds.

In front of 10,429 in attendance, Lomachenko survived a knockdown in round 6 to win via TKO in round 10 after a perfectly placed liver shot to claim the WBA (Super) and The Ring lightweight titles. In doing so he became the fastest fighter ever to win titles in 3 different weight classes (only 12 professional fights) shattering the previous record of 20 held by Jeff Fenech. Lomachenko wore Linares down with his fast shots through the first 9 rounds, before finishing the fight in round 10. Linares slowly beat the count but looked too hurt to continue. Referee Ricky Gonzalez stopped the fight at 2 minutes, 8 seconds of round 10. The loss snapped Linares' 13-fight win streak. At the time of stoppage, two judges had each fighter ahead 86–84 on their respective scorecards and the third judge Julie Lederman had it 85–85 even. After the fight, Lomachenko said, "It was a great fight. That right hand [that knocked me down], it was a great punch. It happens. I prepared for the last few rounds, and my father [and trainer Anatoly Lomachenko] told me, 'You need to go to the body.' Linares is a great champion, and the fight was good for the fans and everybody." Speaking of the knockout punch, Linares said it was 'perfectly landed.' De La Hoya also congratulated Arum on the fight and told Arum it was good experience working together. According to CompuBox Stats, Linares landed 207 of 739 punches thrown (28%), this included 139 power punches landed and a total amount of 77 body shots landed. Lomachenko landed 213 of 627 punches thrown (34%), with 112 jabs. For the fight, Linares was paid a career high $1 million, with Lomachenko receiving a $1.2 million purse. The card averaged 1,024,00 viewers. The fight itself averaged 1,439,000 viewers and peaked at 1,749,000 viewers, making it the most-watched boxing fight on cable television in 2018. On 23 May, Lomachenko officially vacated his WBO super featherweight title.

Lomachenko vs. Pedraza 
After winning the WBA (Super) and The Ring lightweight titles, promoter Arum stated that Lomachenko would defend the belts on 25 August 2018 at The Forum in Inglewood, California. A possible unification with WBO titleholder Raymundo Beltran was a likely possibility. After vacating his WBO title, Arum stated Lomachenko would not fight on 25 August. It was later revealed that earlier in the bout against Linares, Lomachenko suffered a torn labrum in his right shoulder. He underwent surgery on 30 May at the Cedars-Sinai Kerlan-Jobe Institute in Los Angeles. According to Lomachenko, the shoulder popped out and then back in during the second round. A new return date of December 2018 was targeted. On 10 July, Lomachenko revealed he would return on 25 August. However, on 31 July, his manager Egis Klimas told The Boxing Beat on ESPN+, Lomachenko would make his ring return on 1 December. In the interview, he also stated it would likely be a unification fight against the winner of the Raymundo Beltran vs. José Pedraza bout, which was scheduled to be contested on 25 August. Pedraza defeated Beltran via unanimous decision, winning the WBO title and setting up a fight with Lomachenko. In September, The Ring magazine announced the unification fight between Lomachenko and Pedraza would take place on 8 December 2018 at the Hulu Theatre in New York City.

For the first time as a professional, Lomachenko unified in a weight division as he beat Pedraza via unanimous decision to retain his WBA (Super) title and claim Pedraza's WBO lightweight title, before a sellout crowd of 5,312. Lomachenko coasted to victory with the three judges scoring the bout 119–107, 117–109, and 117–109 in his favour. The first half of the fight was a rather tentative and tactical affair with neither fighter making a statement, however it was Lomachenko who was landing the more cleaner and points scoring shots. By mid-fight Lomachenko looked to have a solid lead on the cards, but the fight seemed closer in the ring. It was during the championship rounds where the fight came alive. Round 10 was arguably Pedraza's best as he landed a hard right hand to Lomachenko's body. He followed up with a few more shots to the body. Round 11, which was the round of the fight, saw Lomachenko come out quick and land a total of 42 power shots, his busiest round of the fight. In the middle of the round, Lomachenko shook Pedraza following a left hand, which eventually followed with a right hand to the body, dropping Pedraza. Although he beat the count, Pedraza was dropped a second time with over 10 seconds to go following a left to the body. Again, Pedraza beat the count and survived the round. Pedraza used the final round to stay out of reach and take Lomachenko the 12 round distance. The fight ended Lomachenko's 8-fight stoppage streak, in which he saw four consecutive opponents retire on their stool in between rounds. According to CompuBox stats, Lomachenko landed 240 of 738 punches thrown (33%), and Pedraza landed a very low 111 of his 931 punches thrown (12%). 506 of Pedraza's shots thrown where jabs in which only 31 landed. Lomachenko landed 158 power punches throughout the fight.

In the post-fight interview, Lomachenko credited Pedraza as being a tough and tricky fighter, which is why he couldn't score the stoppage victory. He added, "It was my dream to unify titles. It was my next goal. I can now focus on my next chapter." Pedraza was happy with his performance and that he went "12 rounds with the best fighter in the world." He thought the fight was close up until round 11. Arum stated Lomachenko only wanted challenges going forward and would likely next fight in May 2019. The fight averaged 2,013,000 viewers, making it the second most-watched boxing match on American cable or network television in 2018. The fight peaked over 2.1 million viewers and the entire ESPN telecast averaged 1,865,000 viewers. Lomachenko was guaranteed a purse of $1 million, rising to $2 million and Pedraza was guaranteed $350,000, potentially earning closer to $1 million.

Lomachenko vs. Crolla 
Within a week of Lomachenko successfully unifying at lightweight, Top Rank president Todd duBoef announced Lomachenko would return to the ring on 12 April 2019 at the Staples Center in Los Angeles, headlining Friday night Top Rank Boxing on ESPN. With Richard Commey and Isa Chaniev set to fight for the vacant IBF lightweight title, it was highly likely that the winner would fight Lomachenko in what would be Lomachenko's second unification fight. Top Rank intended to finalize the deal with promoter Lou DiBella, which would see Commey vs. Chaniev take place on 2 February 2019 at the Ford Center in Frisco, Texas. By the end of January 2019, purse bids for Lomachenko vs. Anthony Crolla were pushed back two days to 6 February 2019 with the minimum bid being $150,000.

Commey defeated Chaniev to become the new IBF lightweight champion, however picked up a hand injury during the fight. His promoter Lou DiBella advised Top Rank, Commey would be out of training for a minimum of two months. This prompted Top Rank to start searching for a new opponent for Lomachenko. On 20 February, it was announced that Lomachenko would defend his WBA (Super), WBO and The Ring titles against Crolla at the Staples Center in Los Angeles, California on 12 April 2019. The bout, including the full undercard would be streamed live and exclusive on ESPN+, to mark the one year anniversary of the streaming service. The fight was made official a week later with ticket information. The bout would mark Crolla's first time fighting in the US, having only fought once previously outside of his native UK. It was reported that Lomachenko would earn $1.2 million, but guaranteed closer to $3.2 million. Crolla, who was a heavy 100-1 underdog, had an official purse of $300,000 for the fight, however guaranteed more due to UK TV rights.

In front of 10,101 in attendance, Lomachenko stopped Crolla in the first minute of round 4. The initial two rounds were paced and methodical as Lomachenko visibly started to out-throw Crolla during round 2. In round 3, Lomachenko became overwhelmingly dominant while forcing Crolla to spend a majority of his time against the ropes. With 11 seconds left in the round, Lomachenko's combination was interrupted by referee Jack Reiss. At first glance, Lomachenko, and even the crowd, thought it looked as if Reiss had stopped the fight, causing Lomachenko to celebrate by jumping on the corner ropes. However, Reiss immediately corrected the misunderstanding and forced out commissioners who had climbed into the ring, and resumed the fight after a 10-second count for Crolla — although with 1 second left, the round effectively ended immediately. Between rounds 3 and 4, Reiss explained he'd not actually waved off the fight, and instead called a technical knockdown — he was seen immediately pointing and saying "down". He explained he was accounting for the ropes' aid to Crolla's ability to stand, since if the ropes had been absent Crolla would've been down and it is against the rules for a fighter to have any outside support in standing throughout the entire duration of the fight, thus justifying this rarely used but sanctioned technical knockdown. Because of this, Crolla continued on into round 4 where after briefly trying to rally back he was knocked down in second 52 by a right hook to the temple. Crolla fell to the canvas face-first, unable to break his fall. After what looked to be a 3 to 4 second count by Reiss, the fight was waved off, giving Lomachenko the win and retaining his sanctioned belts. Crolla was unable to participate in the post-fight interviews, but did not decide to immediately go to hospital. According to CompuBox Stats, Lomachenko landed 72 of 249 shots (29%), and Crolla landed only 12 of his 96 thrown (13%), this included 7 power shots, compared to Lomachenko's 58 power shots.

In the post-fight press conference, Lomachenko said he thought it was a clear waving of the fight by Reiss, who had his back to Lomachenko and entered the exchange in a manner intent on protecting Crolla.

Lomachenko vs. Campbell 

Lomachenko faced fellow 2012 Olympic gold medallist Luke Campbell on 31 August 2019, at The O2 Arena in London in front of a sold-out crowd of over 18,000. Lomachenko retained the WBA, WBO and The Ring lightweight titles, and gained the vacant WBC lightweight title by defeating Campbell by unanimous decision. He was in fine form, winning by 119–108 on two judges' cards, and 118–109 on the other. Despite being a heavy underdog, Campbell started well and took the first round. Lomachenko soon found his groove, however, and almost had Campbell down in the 5th round but for the bell. Campbell took more shots in round 6, but fired back and the fight remained competitive. Lomachenko knocked down Campbell in the 11th round after a series of body shots followed by a stiff jab. Campbell beat the count, and ultimately survived the round and the fight, receiving credit after the bout for his resilience. In his in-ring interview, Lomachenko called for a lightweight unification fight with the winner of Richard Commey vs. Teófimo López, who contested for the IBF title in December.

Lomachenko vs. López 

In September 2020, Lomachenko agreed to fight newly crowned undefeated IBF lightweight champion, Teófimo López, on 17 October 2020 at the MGM Grand Conference Center in Paradise, Nevada. With no live audience, Lomachenko suffered the second defeat of his career, losing by UD with the scorecards reading 116–112, 117–111, and 119–109. Judge Julie Lederman's scorecard of 119–109, giving Lomachenko only a single round, received significant controversy. The first seven rounds saw López staying behind his jab and going to the body, with Lomachenko offering little in response. In the second half, Lomachenko started coming out more offensively, landing more punches. In the final round, López landed 50 of 98 punches thrown (51%), the most an opponent has landed on Lomachenko in a round. According to CompuBox stats, Lomachenko landed 141 of 321 thrown (44%), while López landed 183 of 659 thrown (28%). Days after the fight, Lomachenko underwent surgery on his right shoulder.

López declined to give Lomachenko a rematch, explaining that "everybody [in Lomachenko's camp] was being a dick to me, my father. He [Lomachenko] didn't want to put a rematch clause in our contract."

Lomachenko vs. Nakatani 

Lomachenko made his comeback in a fight against Masayoshi Nakatani on 26 June 2021. Lomachenko and Nakatani both shared a common loss to undefeated unified lightweight champion Teófimo López, which Lomachenko cited as the reason why he chose Nakatani as his next opponent, saying, "I want to compare myself with this guy, he was close with [López] in their fight." The fight against Nakatani was only the second fight of Lomachenko's career in which a world title was not at stake, after his professional debut against José Luis Ramírez in 2013. On the night, Lomachenko scored a knockdown in the fifth round en route to a ninth-round technical knockout victory. After the fight, he made clear his intentions of wanting to rematch López in the winter, saying, "December, January, February. I'm waiting."

Lomachenko vs. Commey

In an attempt to put his name back into contention for a shot at his old titles, Lomachenko agreed to face former IBF lightweight champion, Richard Commey, on 11 December 2021 in New York. On fight night, Lomachenko dropped Commey in the seventh round courtesy of a left hook, later pleading with the corner of the still unsteady Commey to stop the fight. They refused, and Commey survived and went the full 12 rounds, with the judges scoring it 119–108, 119–108, and 117–110, all in favour of Lomachenko. When asked about fighting newly crowned unified lightweight champion, George Kambosos Jr., who had upset Teofimo Lopez a few weeks previously, Lomachenko jumped at the idea, stating that he 'needs this chance' and would be willing to fly to Australia if necessary. However, on 24 February 2022 Russia launched an invasion of Ukraine and Lomachenko returned to his home country to aid in the war effort. On 20 March, Lomachenko was given permission to leave Ukraine in order to face George Kambosos Jr. in Australia. However, he declined, opting to stay and fight for his country. Kambosos Jr. instead lost his titles to WBC champion Devin Haney, who thereby became the undisputed lightweight champion.

Lomachenko vs. Ortiz 
On 7 July 2022, Top Rank president, Todd DuBoef, indicated Lomachenko was planning a return to the boxing ring in October. 29 October 2022 saw Lomachenko step back into the ring to face former sparring partner, 26 year old undefeated Jamaine Ortiz. After a very tough 12 round battle, Lomachenko emerged victorious with a unanimous decision, the three judges scoring the fight 115–113, 116–112, and 117–111. With the win, Lomachenko was poised to next challenge undisputed champion Devin Haney, who was ringside for the fight and expressed interest in fighting Lomachenko.

Personal life
Lomachenko is married to Olena, and they have two children. As of 2019 (and since at least 2016), he lives in Camarillo, California and trains in nearby Oxnard, just north of Los Angeles.

The face tattooed on Lomachenko's torso is that of his father and trainer, Anatoly Lomachenko.

During the 2022 Russian invasion of Ukraine, Lomachenko joined the Ukrainian army. After travelling back to Ukraine from Greece, Lomachenko joined the territorial defense battalion of his hometown of Bilhorod-Dnistrovskyi on 27 February 2022. Lomachenko was in Greece when the invasion began (on 24 February 2022), and his flight home to Ukraine the next day was delayed due to air traffic being grounded. He managed to get into Ukraine by flying to Bucharest and travelling through Romania on 26 February 2022. He followed Ukrainian brothers Wladimir Klitschko and Vitali Klitschko, former heavyweight boxing champions, who also announced their pledge to protect the capital of Ukraine, Kyiv, in February 2022.

Fighting style
Lomachenko is known for his exceptional footwork, head movement, speed, and ability to switch stances. Lomachenko's inspirations include Muhammad Ali, Mike Tyson, and Roy Jones Jr.

Professional boxing record

See also
List of featherweight boxing champions
List of super-featherweight boxing champions
List of lightweight boxing champions
List of boxing triple champions

References

External links

1988 births
Living people
People from Bilhorod-Dnistrovskyi
Ukrainian male boxers
AIBA World Boxing Championships medalists
Dynamo sports society athletes
Olympic boxers of Ukraine
Boxers at the 2008 Summer Olympics
Boxers at the 2012 Summer Olympics
Medalists at the 2008 Summer Olympics
Medalists at the 2012 Summer Olympics
Olympic gold medalists for Ukraine
Olympic medalists in boxing
World featherweight boxing champions
World super-featherweight boxing champions
World lightweight boxing champions
World Boxing Organization champions
World Boxing Association champions
World Boxing Council champions
The Ring (magazine) champions
Territorial Defense Forces of Ukraine personnel
Ukrainian military personnel of the 2022 Russian invasion of Ukraine
K. D. Ushinsky South Ukrainian National Pedagogical University alumni
Sportspeople from Odesa Oblast